Shahead Metro Station is a station on Shiraz Metro Line 1. The station opened on 5 May 2015. It is located on Shahed Boulevard a between Mirza-ye Shirazi Metro Station and Qasrodasht Metro Station.

Shiraz Metro stations
Railway stations opened in 2015